Ovčiarsko is a village and municipality in Žilina District in the Žilina Region of northern Slovakia.

History
In historical records the village was first mentioned in 1289.

Geography
The municipality lies at an altitude of 420 metres and covers an area of 4.894 km². It has a population of about 483 people.

External links
http://www.statistics.sk/mosmis/eng/run.html

Villages and municipalities in Žilina District